Jack "The Ripper" Roberts (September 27, 1910 – October 1981) was an American football running back in the National Football League for the Boston Braves, the Staten Island Stapletons, the Philadelphia Eagles, and the Pittsburgh Pirates.  He played college football at the University of Georgia. At Georgia he wore number 7.

External links
Jack Robert's stats at DatabaseFootball.com

1910 births
1981 deaths
People from Bartow County, Georgia
Sportspeople from the Atlanta metropolitan area
Players of American football from Georgia (U.S. state)
American football running backs
Georgia Bulldogs football players
All-Southern college football players
Boston Braves (NFL) players
Staten Island Stapletons players
Philadelphia Eagles players
Pittsburgh Pirates (football) players